The 1976 Tour de France was the 63rd edition of the Tour de France, one of cycling's Grand Tours. The Tour began in Saint-Jean-de-Monts with a prologue individual time trial on 24 June, and Stage 13 occurred on 9 July with a mountainous stage from Font-Romeu-Odeillo-Via. The race finished in Paris on 18 July.

Stage 13
9 July 1976 – Font-Romeu-Odeillo-Via to Saint-Gaudens,

Stage 14
10 July 1976 – Saint-Gaudens to Saint-Lary-Soulan,

Stage 15
11 July 1976 – Saint-Lary-Soulan to Pau,

Stage 16
12 July 1976 – Pau to Fleurance,

Stage 17
13 July 1976 – Fleurance to Auch,  (ITT)

Stage 18a
14 July 1976 – Auch to Langon,

Stage 18b
14 July 1976 – Langon to Lacanau,

Stage 18c
14 July 1976 – Lacanau to Bordeaux,

Stage 19
15 July 1976 – Sainte-Foy-la-Grande to Tulle,

Stage 20
16 July 1976 – Tulle to Puy de Dôme,

Stage 21
17 July 1976 – Montargis to Versailles,

Stage 22a
18 July 1976 – Paris to Paris,  (ITT)

Stage 22b
18 July 1976 – Paris to Paris Champs-Élysées,

Notes

References

1976 Tour de France
Tour de France stages